Regina D. Thomas is a former Democratic member of the Georgia State Senate, representing the 2nd District since a special election January 11, 2000. Previously, she was a member of the Georgia House of Representatives from 1994 to 1998.

In the 2008 election, Thomas sought election to the U.S. House of Representatives from Georgia's 12th congressional district, running in the Democratic primary against the incumbent, John Barrow. She lost her challenge to Barrow by approximately 50 percentage points. She ran again in 2010, and, having unsuccessfully sought the Democratic nomination, planned to run as a write-in candidate in the general election, but in August 2010 the office of the Secretary of State of Georgia ruled that she was ineligible to do so.

In January 2019, Thomas announced that she planned to run for Mayor of Savannah, Georgia in that year's election. Thomas received 13.5% of the vote in the first round and was eliminated.

References

External links
 Regina Thomas' 2008 campaign site
 42 Reasons video
 Georgia Legislature – Senator Regina Thomas official government site
 Project Vote Smart – Senator Regina D. Thomas (GA) profile
 Follow the Money – Regina D Thomas
 2006 2004 2002 2000 1998 1996 campaign contributions

Georgia (U.S. state) state senators
Members of the Georgia House of Representatives
Women state legislators in Georgia (U.S. state)
Year of birth missing (living people)
Living people
Politicians from Savannah, Georgia
21st-century American politicians
21st-century American women politicians